Augusta State Medical Prison is located in Grovetown on the County lines of Columbia County and Richmond County in Georgia, United States. It houses male and rarely female inmates, the capacity is 1326. It was constructed in 1982 and opened in 1983. It is a Close Security Prison. Augusta was one of the 7 prisons involved in the 2010 Georgia prison strike.

References

Buildings and structures in Columbia County, Georgia
Prisons in Georgia (U.S. state)
1983 establishments in Georgia (U.S. state)